Belkheir  is a town and commune in Guelma Province, Algeria. According to the 2008 census it has a population of 17,649.

References

Communes of Guelma Province